The Vancouver Canucks are a professional ice hockey team based in Vancouver, British Columbia, Canada. The Canucks are members of the National Hockey League (NHL) and are members of the Pacific Division in the Western Conference. The Canucks were founded in 1945 as a member of the Pacific Coast Hockey League (PCHL). They won the President's Cup in their first season, and another in 1948. In 1952, the PCHL was renamed the Western Hockey League (WHL), where the Canucks won four more league titles in 1958, 1960, 1969 and 1970. In 1960, the President's Cup was renamed the Lester Patrick Cup to honour the late Lester Patrick.

After a failed attempt to gain an expansion team in the NHL's first expansion in 1967, a group from Vancouver tried to move the financial struggling Oakland Seals to town in 1969. However, the NHL prevented the move from happening. Prior to the 1970 NHL expansion a Minneapolis, Minnesota based company, Medicor, purchased the WHL Canucks, and an expansion franchise was granted for the NHL beginning in the 1970–71 season. The Canucks have not enjoyed the same success in the NHL, having thus far been unable to capture the Stanley Cup. The Canucks franchise has captured three conference titles, 1981–82, 1993–94, and 2010–11, and ten division titles in its NHL history.

Table key

Year by year
For the PCHL and WHL seasons, see Vancouver Canucks (WHL).

Notes
a: From 1981 until 1993, the team that won its divisional playoff (2nd round matchup) was the division champion, regardless of regular season standing, essentially creating a regular season champion and a post season champion. Vancouver recognizes both the regular season division champions and post season champions from this time period.
b: Beginning in 1999, overtime losses were worth one point. As of the 2005–06 NHL season, all games will have a winner; the OTL column includes SOL (Shootout losses).
c: Season was shortened to 48 games due to the 1994–95 NHL lockout.
d: Season was shortened to 48 games due to the 2012–13 NHL lockout.
e: Season was suspended on March 12, 2020 due to the COVID-19 pandemic.
f: Season was shortened to 56 games due to the aforementioned COVID-19 pandemic.

All-time records

Statistics above are correct as of the end of the 2021–22 NHL season.

References

General

1945–48 stats: Vancouver Canucks (1945-52) @ hockeydb.com
1949–52 stats: 1949-52 PCHL @ hockeyleaguehistory.com
1952–70 stats: 1952-74 WHL @ hockeyleaguehistory.com
1970–present stats: Vancouver Canucks (1970- ) @ hockeydb.com

Specific

National Hockey League team seasons
 
Vancouver Canucks
seasons